Pasirpanjang is a village in Brebes, Central Java, Indonesia. It is located at the foot of a mountain.

2018 landslide
In February 2018 the village was struck by a large channelised landslide which killed eighteen people who were in the streets and working in mountainside fields. Seven bodies were never recovered.

References 

Villages in Central Java